Neurergus is a genus of salamanders, more specifically newts, in the family Salamandridae. They are found in the Middle East (predominantly in Turkey and Iran), and are kept and bred in captivity for their bright colors.  In nature, they inhabit streams and small rivers, and the surrounding forests or shrublands.  All of the Neurergus are considered threatened species, primarily due to destruction of habitat and overcollection for the pet trade.

Morphology
Generally, Neurergus species are dark-colored (brown to black) above, with a pattern of white to yellow to orange spots and lines. On their ventral sides, the lighter color of their spots becomes a solid color.  Like most salamanders, they have five toes on their hind feet.

Species
Studies have demonstrated the genus Neurergus is monophyletic. It contains these species:

References

External links
 "Neurergus Cope, 1862" Salamanders of the Old World, 
 "Neurergus (Cope, 1862)" Living Under World.Org, A Web Project about Amphibians
 "Neurergus kaiseri" photographs of Neurergus kaiseri

 
Taxa named by Edward Drinker Cope
Amphibian genera
Taxonomy articles created by Polbot